Ana Gradišnik (born 4 October 1996) is a Slovenian pool player. She is a three-time runner-up at events on the Euro Tour.

References

External links

Living people
1996 births
Slovenian pool players
Place of birth missing (living people)